The 1st G6 summit took place on 15–17 November 1975, in Rambouillet, France. The venue for the summit meetings was the Château de Rambouillet near Paris.

The Group of Six (G6) was an unofficial forum which brought together the heads of the richest industrialized countries: France, West Germany, Italy, Japan, the United Kingdom, and the United States. This summit, and the others which would follow, were not meant to be linked formally with wider international institutions; and in fact, a kind of frustrated rebellion against the stiff formality of other international meetings was an element in the genesis of cooperation between France's president and West Germany's chancellor as they conceived the first summit of the G6.

Later summits in what could become a continuing series of annual meetings were identified as the Group of Seven (G7) and Group of Eight (G8) summits — but this informal gathering was the one which set that process in motion.

Leaders at the summit
This was an unofficial forum (retreat) for the leaders of France, Germany, Italy, Japan, the United Kingdom, and the United States, and a chance for them to get to know one another. It was important to note that each of them had attained office the previous year due to unforeseeable circumstances.

Participants
These summit participants considered themselves representative of the "core" industrialized countries forum:

Issues
The summit was intended as a venue for resolving differences among its members. As a practical matter, the summit was also conceived as an opportunity for its members to give each other mutual encouragement in the face of difficult economic decisions. Rambouillet had no easy answers to what was then the most serious recession since the 1930s; but the main themes of what would later become known as the "1st G7/G8 summit" will remain for decades on the world's agenda—avoiding protectionism, energy dependency and boosting growth.

Issues which were discussed at this summit included:
 Searching and productive exchange of views on world economy
 Political and economic responsibilities of democracies
 Growth of interdependence and fostering international cooperation
 Inflation and energy crises
 Unemployment and economic recovery
 Fostering growth of world trade
 Monetary stability
 Multilateral trade negotiations
 Economic relations with the Soviet Union and the Eastern Bloc 
 Cooperative relationship and improved understanding of developing countries
 Conference on International Economic Co-operation
 Cooperation via international organizations

Gallery

Notes

References
 Bayne, Nicholas and Robert D. Putnam. (2000).  Hanging in There: The G7 and G8 Summit in Maturity and Renewal. Aldershot, Hampshire, England: Ashgate Publishing. ; OCLC 43186692 (Archived 2009-05-13)
 Reinalda, Bob and Bertjan Verbeek. (1998).  Autonomous Policy Making by International Organizations. London: Routledge. ; ;   OCLC 39013643

External links
 No official website is created for any G6/G7 summit prior to 1995 – see the 21st G7 summit.
 

G6 summit
G6 summit
1975 in international relations
G6 summit 1975
G6 summit 1975
1975
November 1975 events in Europe